Rosulje is a village in the municipality of Tešanj, Bosnia and Herzegovina.

Demographics 
According to the 2013 census, its population was 893.

References

Populated places in Tešanj